Brenda Buttner (May 22, 1961 – February 20, 2017) was a senior business correspondent and host of Bulls & Bears on Fox News. She also frequently contributed to Your World with Neil Cavuto.

Buttner was born in Santa Cruz County, California. She graduated from Harvard University in 1983 with a bachelor's degree in social studies. She then spent two years as a Rhodes Scholar at Balliol College, Oxford University, England, where she graduated with high honors and received a B.A. in politics and economics. After completing her studies at Oxford, Buttner moved to Reno, Nevada, where she began her television career at NBC affiliate KCRL-TV. She was a former feature editor of Cycle World magazine, an enthusiast motorcycle publication.

Buttner hosted CNBC's The Money Club and served as a Washington correspondent from 1990 to 1993 and general correspondent from 1995 to 1998 for the cable outlet. In 2000, she joined Fox News where she would spend the rest of her career.

Buttner received numerous awards for her work, including a Cable Ace Award in 1996 for best business programming (The Money Club) and a National Clarion award in 1990 for best news story. In addition, many of her personal finance articles have been published in popular publications such as The New York Times and Ladies' Home Journal.

She was a resident of Ridgewood, New Jersey. She died at age 55 on February 20, 2017, following a battle with cancer.

References

External links

Bio on FoxNews.com

1961 births
2017 deaths
American business and financial journalists
Women business and financial journalists
American women television journalists
20th-century American journalists
21st-century American journalists
Fox News people
Fox Business people
CNBC people
American investors
Harvard College alumni
Alumni of Balliol College, Oxford
American Rhodes Scholars
Mass media people from California
People from Ridgewood, New Jersey
Deaths from cancer in New Jersey
Place of death missing
20th-century American women
21st-century American women